Robert Lowther may refer to:

Bobby Lowther (Robert Carswell Lowther, Sr., 1923–2015), American athlete and coach
Robert Lowther (died 1430), MP for Cumberland (UK Parliament constituency)
Robert Lowther (colonial administrator) (1681–1745), Governor of Barbados and Member of Parliament for Westmorland 1705–1708
Robert Lowther (1741–1777), Member of Parliament for Westmorland 1759–1761 and 1763–1764